River of No Return is a 1954 American Western film directed by Otto Preminger and starring Robert Mitchum and Marilyn Monroe. The screenplay by Frank Fenton is based on a story by Louis Lantz, who borrowed his premise from the 1948 Italian film Bicycle Thieves.  The picture was shot on location in the Canadian Rockies in Technicolor and CinemaScope and released by 20th Century Fox.

Plot
Set in the Northwestern United States in 1875, the film focuses on taciturn widower Matt Calder (Robert Mitchum), who has recently been released from prison after serving time for killing one man while defending another. He arrives in a boomtown tent city in search of his nine-year-old son Mark (Tommy Rettig), who was left in the care of dance hall singer Kay (Marilyn Monroe) after the man who brought him there, as Matt had arranged, abandoned him. Matt promises Mark, a virtual stranger to him, the two will enjoy a life of hunting, fishing and farming on their homestead.

Kay's fiance, gambler Harry Weston (Rory Calhoun), tells her they must go to Council City to file the deed on a gold mine he won in a poker game. They head downriver on a log raft, and when they encounter trouble in the rapids near the Calder farm, Matt and Mark rescue them. Harry offers to buy Matt's rifle and horse so as to reach Council City by land. When Matt refuses, Harry knocks Matt unconscious and steals both horse and rifle. Kay chooses to stay behind to take care of Matt and Mark, and the three are stranded in the wilderness.

When hostile Indians attack the farm, the three are forced to escape down the river on Harry's raft. That night they set up camp by the river, and Matt and Kay argue about the wisdom of pursuing Harry. Matt asks why Kay would choose to marry a man who had endangered a child, whereupon she reminds him that Harry never killed a man like Matt did. Mark overhears their discussion, and Matt is forced to reveal the truth about his past to his son, who is unable to comprehend why his father acted as he did.

As the three continue their journey, Kay comes to appreciate Matt's bravery and the tender way he cares for both her and Mark. Along the way, they are forced to deal with a series of trials and tribulations, including a mountain lion attack; gold prospectors Sam Benson and Dave Colby, who are after Harry for stealing their claim; and a second Indian war party.

After a difficult ride through the worst of the rapids, the three arrive in Council City and confront Harry. Harry shoots at Matt, prompting Mark to shoot Harry in the back, using a rifle that he was inspecting in the general store. As a result, Mark comes to understand why his father had to shoot a man in a similar fashion so many years before.

Afterwards, Kay finds a job at the local saloon. While she is singing there, Matt walks into the saloon and throws Kay over his shoulder to take her back to his farm along with Mark. She happily leaves with him. The final scene is Kay throwing her high heeled showgirl shoes from their buckboard into the street, a renunciation of her old life.

Cast
 Robert Mitchum as Matt Calder
 Marilyn Monroe as Kay Weston
 Tommy Rettig as Mark Calder
 Rory Calhoun as Harry Weston
 Douglas Spencer as Sam Benson
 Murvyn Vye as Dave Colby
 Hank Mann	as Townsman (uncredited)

Production

Pre-production
Otto Preminger was preparing for the opening of The Moon Is Blue when 20th Century Fox executive Darryl F. Zanuck assigned him to direct River of No Return as part of his contract with the studio. Because of their previous experience with Westerns, producer Stanley Rubin had wanted William Wellman, Raoul Walsh, or Henry King to helm the film, and he was concerned Preminger, who he felt was better suited for film noir melodrama or sophisticated comedy, would be unable to rise to the task of directing a piece of Americana. Preminger himself had no interest in the project until he read the screenplay and saw potential in the story. He also approved of Robert Mitchum and Marilyn Monroe, who already had been cast in the lead roles.

Zanuck decided the film should be made in CinemaScope and increased the budget accordingly. Much of it would be filmed in Banff, Jasper National Parks, Lake Louise in Alberta and the Salmon River in Idaho where the story actually takes place. Director Preminger and producer Rubin flew to the area to scout locations. During their time there, Rubin grew fond of the director and began to feel that rather than viewing it as a contractual obligation, Preminger had a real interest in making the film.

Rubin scheduled twelve weeks of preproduction, during which Monroe rehearsed and recorded the musical numbers written by Ken Darby and Lionel Newman, and forty-five days for filming.

Filming

The cast and crew departed for Calgary in late June 1953. From there they traveled by special train to the Banff Springs Hotel, which would serve as their base during the Canadian filming.

Monroe was accompanied by Natasha Lytess, her acting coach. Preminger clashed with the woman from the very start. She insisted on taking her client aside and giving her direction contrary to that of Preminger, and she had the actress enunciating each syllable of every word of dialogue with exaggerated emphasis. Preminger called Rubin in Los Angeles and insisted Lytess be banned from the set, but when the producer complied with his demand, Monroe called Zanuck directly and asserted she couldn't continue unless Lytess returned. Zanuck commiserated with Preminger but, feeling Monroe was a major box office draw he couldn't afford to upset, he reinstated Lytess. Angered by the decision, Preminger directed his rage at Monroe for the rest of the production.

During the difficult shoot, Preminger also had to contend with frequent rain, Mitchum's heavy drinking, and an injury to Monroe's ankle that kept her off the set for several days and ultimately put her in a cast.  Monroe nearly drowned while filming. She had donned chest-high hip waders during rehearsal to protect her costume. She slipped on a rock, the waders filled with water, and she was unable to rise. Mitchum and others jumped in the river to rescue her but her ankle was sprained as a result. Young Tommy Rettig seemed to be the director's sole source of solace. He respected Rettig's professionalism and appreciated the rapport he developed with Monroe, which often helped keep her on an even keel. When Lytess began to interfere with Rettig's performance, thereby undermining his confidence, Preminger let the cast and crew know about her behavior and was delighted to find they finally began to support him in his efforts to remove her from the set.

In early September, filming shifted to Los Angeles for interior scenes and close-ups for a river sequence. The latter was filmed in a tank, whereas stunt doubles were used in the long shots filmed on location in Idaho in the actual River of No Return, the Salmon River. Monroe was on crutches, and Preminger had to work around her as much as possible. Despite frequent disagreements with Rubin, Preminger completed the film on September 29, on schedule and within the budget.

The film was one of the first films to use a blood squib to simulate realistic bullet impact. This occurs when Harry (Rory Calhoun) is shot dead in the film's climax. As such, the film beats Run of the Arrow (1957) – which is often credited with being the first to use blood squibs – by three years.

This movie was the first to be filmed in CinemaScope in Canada. River of No Return was the first film released by 20th Century-Fox to feature the "CinemaScope extension" fanfare before the opening credits. Written by Alfred Newman, it's a rerecording of his original 1933 fanfare, with the extra few bars that play under the credit "20th Century-Fox presents A CinemaScope Production". After Fox switched to Panavision in 1967, they went back to their old fanfare, so the extension fanfare wasn't used again until it was revived by George Lucas to play before the opening credits to Star Wars. This time, those few extra bars played under the credit " A Lucasfilm Production". Since then it's been re-recorded a few times but remains to this day the intro to every film released by that studio.

Veteran circus animal trainer Pat Anthony stood-in for Robert Mitchum's character for the cougar attack scene.

Post-production
During post-production, Preminger departed for Europe, leaving editor Louis R. Loeffler and Rubin to complete the film. Jean Negulesco was called in to film a few retakes. The dailies reconfirmed Rubin's belief that Preminger had been the wrong choice for the project. He felt the director had failed to capture the Western aura, had ignored key elements in the plot, and had perfunctorily directed action sequences, leaving them looking staged and static. In several cases, studio and location shots didn't match.

Preminger's experience on the film convinced him he never wanted to work as a studio employee again, and he paid Fox $150,000 to cancel the remainder of his contract.

In later years, Monroe claimed River of No Return was her worst film, and Preminger spoke bitterly about her in numerous interviews. It wasn't until January 1980, when being interviewed for the New York Daily News, that he conceded, "She tried very hard, and when people try hard, you can't be mad at them."

Release
The River of No Return had its world premiere in Denver, Colorado on April 29, 1954; and released theatrically in the United States in New York on April 30, 1954 and in Los Angeles on May 5.

Home media
20th Century Fox Home Entertainment released the film on Region 1 DVD on May 14, 2002. It is in anamorphic widescreen format with audio tracks in English and French and subtitles in English and Spanish. In the United States 20th Century Fox released the film on Blu-ray disc on July 31, 2012 for the first time with the original theatrical trailer as the sole extra feature.

Reception

Critical response
Bosley Crowther of the New York Times observed, "It is a toss-up whether the scenery or the adornment of Marilyn Monroe is the feature of greater attraction in River of No Return ... The mountainous scenery is spectacular, but so, in her own way, is Miss Monroe. The patron's preference, if any, probably will depend upon which he's interested in. Certainly, scriptwriter Frank Fenton has done the best he could to arrange for a fairly equal balance of nature and Miss Monroe ... And that should not be too lightly taken. For Director Otto Preminger has thrown all the grandeur and menace of these features upon the eye-filling CinemaScope screen. A sickening succession of rapids, churned into boiling foam, presents a display of nature's violence that cannot help but ping the patron's nerves. The raft tumbling through these rapids is quite a sight to see. And layouts of Rocky Mountain landscapes are handsome in color, too. But Mr. Mitchum's and the audience's attention is directed to Miss Monroe through frequent and liberal posing of her in full and significant views."

Variety said, "The competition between scenic splendors of the Jasper and Banff National Parks and entertainment values finds the former finishing slightly ahead on merit, although there's enough rugged action and suspense moments to get the production through its footage. In between the high spots, Otto Preminger's directorial pacing is inclined to lag, so the running time seems overlong."

TV Guide rated it  out of four stars, calling it "a simple, frequently charming, and beautifully photographed film blessed with fine performances and great teamwork from Robert Mitchum and Marilyn Monroe" and "an enjoyable, engaging little Western that never fails to entertain."

Film4 called it a "patchy drama which owes more to its gorgeous scenery and musical numbers than it does to anything else ... The plot doesn't convince, but Monroe, at the peak of her career, is more than easy on the eye ... Despite some pretty locations and occasional tension, there's little going on. A shallow river indeed."

References

External links

 
 
 
 

1954 films
1954 Western (genre) films
American Western (genre) films
Films set in the 1870s
Films directed by Otto Preminger
Films scored by Cyril J. Mockridge
Films shot in Alberta
Whitewater films
20th Century Fox films
CinemaScope films
1950s English-language films
1950s American films